Sam McBride (born September 21, 1994 in Greensboro, North Carolina) is an American soccer player.

Career

College
McBride played four years of college soccer at Elon University between 2012 and 2015.

Professional
McBride signed with United Soccer League side San Antonio FC on February 15, 2016.

References

External links
 

1994 births
Living people
American soccer players
Soccer players from North Carolina
Elon Phoenix men's soccer players
San Antonio FC players
USL Championship players
Association football defenders